Blacklick Creek may refer to:

Blacklick Creek (Ohio), a tributary of Big Walnut Creek
Blacklick Creek (Pennsylvania), a tributary of the Conemaugh River